Matica crnogorska is a Montenegrin cultural institution. It was founded in 1993 as a non-governmental organization which promotes Montenegrin national and cultural identity and the Montenegrin language. In 2008, the Parliament of Montenegro adopted the Law on Matica crnogorska, which gave it the status of an independent cultural institution.

In 2000, it began publishing the magazine "Matica".

History
Matica crnogorska was formed on 22 May 1993 in Cetinje. The Matica was one of firm supporters of the country's independence. On 18 March 2008, the Parliament of Montenegro passed the Act of Matica crnogorska, which signifies it as an independent organization in the cultural field.

Presidents
Presidents of Matica Crnogorska:
Dragan Radulović (22 May 2013 – present)
Branko Banjević (23 January 1999 – 22 May 2013)
Božina Ivanović (22 May 1993 – 23 January 1999)

References

External links
 Official Website

Montenegrin culture
1993 establishments in Montenegro
Montenegrin language
Organizations established in 1993
Montenegrin nationalism